The 1941 Saint Mary's Gaels football team was an American football team that represented Saint Mary's College of California during the 1941 college football season. They played their home games off campus at Kezar Stadium in San Francisco. In their second and final season under head coach Red Strader, the Gaels compiled a 5–4 record and outscored their opponents by a combined total of 133 to 123.

Schedule

References

Saint Mary's
Saint Mary's Gaels football seasons
Saint Mary's Gaels football